Steven Patrick Kent (born October 3, 1978) is an American former Major League Baseball pitcher.

Kent was born in Frankfurt to a United States military family and spent much of his young life moving around, a lifestyle he said prepared him for the itinerant life of a professional baseball player. He played college baseball for the Florida International Panthers. Before his first semester at Florida International, he was involved in fatal car accident which resulted in him receiving 55 stitches and cosmetic surgery and missing several months of practice before the start of the season. However, when he returned to play, he found his fastball velocity had increased dramatically.

Kent played for the Tampa Bay Devil Rays during the 2002 season. In 34 games in relief in his one-season career, Kent had a 0–2 record with a 5.65 earned run average. He allowed 67 hits and 41 runs (36 earned) in 57.1 innings. From 2003–2007 Kent spent time with the Florida Marlins, Colorado Rockies, Atlanta Braves and Houston Astros. The highlight of Kent's brief MLB career came on May 19, 2002. Kent pitched 4 scoreless innings to pick up his only MLB save during a Rays victory over the Orioles.

In , Kent pitched for three different teams in the Atlantic League of Professional Baseball.

He attended Odessa Junior College.

References

External links
, or Retrosheet
Baseball-Almanac
Venezuelan Professional Baseball League statistics

1978 births
Águilas del Zulia players
Bravos de Margarita players
Bridgeport Bluefish players
Carolina Mudcats players
Colorado Springs Sky Sox players
Corpus Christi Hooks players
Everett AquaSox players
FIU Panthers baseball players
Jupiter Hammerheads players
Kansas City T-Bones players
Lancaster Barnstormers players
Living people
Long Island Ducks players
Mississippi Braves players
Newark Bears players
Round Rock Express players
San Bernardino Stampede players
Shreveport-Bossier Captains players
Tampa Bay Devil Rays players
Tiburones de La Guaira players
American expatriate baseball players in Venezuela
Tulsa Drillers players
Sportspeople from Frankfurt
American expatriate baseball players in Taiwan
Brother Elephants players